TDRS-9, known before launch as TDRS-I, is an American communications satellite which was operated by NASA as part of the Tracking and Data Relay Satellite System. It was constructed by the Boeing Satellite Development Center,  formerly Hughes Space and Communications, and is based on the BSS-601 satellite bus. It was the second Advanced TDRS, or second-generation Tracking and Data Relay Satellite, to be launched.

History

An Atlas IIA rocket was used to launch TDRS-I, under a contract with International Launch Services. The launch occurred at 22:59 GMT on 8 March 2002, and used Space Launch Complex 36A at the Cape Canaveral Air Force Station.

Deployment and problems
TDRS-9 separated from its carrier rocket into a geosynchronous transfer orbit. At 06:00 on 6 October, following a series of apogee burns, it reached geostationary orbit. The orbit raising maneuvers were originally scheduled to take ten days, but ended up lasting six months due to a problem with the system used to pressurize its number two fuel tank. A valve used to release helium into the tank failed to open. This was later established to have been due to a wiring error prior to launch. Engineers developed a solution which involved pressurizing the tank using the pressurization system from the number one tank, which was still working, once the propellant in that tank had been used. When orbit raising operations resumed on 19 March, it was estimated that it would take two months to raise the satellite's orbit. It was later discovered that only using fuel from the number one tank upset the satellite's center of mass, causing the satellite to tumble when its main engines were fired. Controllers were able to compensate for this, however it took longer to raise the orbit as a result.

Operations
Upon reaching geostationary orbit, TDRS-I was initially placed at a longitude 151 degrees west of the Greenwich Meridian, and following on-orbit testing it received its operational designation, TDRS-9. In October 2003 it was moved from 151° West, and it arrived at 173.5° West in January 2004. It remained there until September, when it was moved to 64.5° West, arriving in March 2005. Engineers believe that the problems with its fuel tank pressurization system will not affect its operational lifespan.

See also 

 List of TDRS satellites

References 

Communications satellites in geostationary orbit
Satellites using the BSS-601 bus
Spacecraft launched in 2002
TDRS satellites
Spacecraft launched by Atlas rockets